{{DISPLAYTITLE:C30H50O2}}
The molecular formula C30H50O2 (molar mass: 442.71 g/mol, exact mass: 442.3811 u) may refer to:

 Arnidiol
 Betulin
 Inotodiol

Molecular formulas